Fort Brockhurst is one of the Palmerston Forts, in Gosport, England, and a Scheduled Ancient Monument. It is now an English Heritage property.

History

Construction, 1858–1862
Fort Brockhurst was designed by William Crossman in the 19th century to protect Portsmouth. Built between 1858 and 1862, it was one of a chain of five similar forts known as the Gosport Advanced Line. The other forts are Fort Elson to the north and Fort Grange, Fort Rowner and Fort Gomer to the south. With their formidable firepower, their main purpose was to guard the dockyards from potential attack from landing areas on the Hampshire coast. Construction took place amid fears of a French invasion at the time, which, in the event, never occurred.

Changes in artillery technology meant that the fort was obsolete before construction was even completed. Increases in range left the fort too close to the dockyard, meaning that a landing force that had arrived elsewhere on the coast would not need to pass the fort in order to bombard Portsmouth harbour. This was the reason for the construction of Fort Fareham at a greater distance from the harbour, which was completed six years later in 1868.

Commission, 1862–1957
The fort did remain in commission however until 1957, serving variously as accommodation, storage and training facilities. In August 1914, 9th (Heavy) Battery Royal Garrison Artillery was formed at the fort as part of the raising of Kitchener's Army. It suffered minor bomb damage during the Second World War, but never saw action under its intended purpose.

English Heritage site, 1957–present
Although modern life has encroached on the fort, its fabric remains largely unaltered and the parade ground, gun ramps and moated keep can all be viewed.
Constructional details of the casemates are able to be seen due to unrepaired Second World War bomb damage at the north-east corner.
It is currently used as a store for English Heritage's reserve collections. The fort is occasionally open to the public, while the grounds are freely accessible.

Layout of the fort
The polygonal shape of the fort was a revolutionary change from the prevailing orthodoxy of forts designed with angle bastions for defence. The new forts could be more easily adapted to the terrain and allowed a greatly increased number of heavy guns mounted on the ramparts to prioritise offence over defence. Each fort was located within gunshot of the next to allow overlapping fields of fire and mutual support.

The fort was surrounded by a moat and the entrance on the southeast side was approached by a drawbridge much like a medieval castle. This led to a circular keep, also moated, which served as a place for local defence, being equipped with twenty light guns. The nineteen heavy guns of the main armament were mounted on the ramparts reached by two ramps on the enclosed parade ground in the middle of the fort. A lower tier of eight guns, four in casements, on each flank provided cross fire support with Elson and Rowner. Beyond the moat on the north side was a triangular redan accessed by a covered way to allow riflemen to cover attempts to bridge the moat. Similarly there were caponiers at the angles of the ramparts to allow riflemen to cover the moat.

References

Bibliography

External links 

 Fort Brockhurst page at English Heritage
 Information for teachers: English Heritage
 The Palmerston Forts Society
 Victorian Forts datasheet

Fort Brockhurst
Palmerston Forts
Forts in Portsmouth
Forts in Hampshire
Fort Brockhurst
Fort Brockhurst
Fort Brockhurst
Fort Brockhurst